The Elisha Purington House also known as Pride Farm, is an historic house at 71 Mast Road in Falmouth, Maine.  Built in 1761, it is a rare surviving example of Georgian architecture in Maine's rural interior.  It was listed on the National Register of Historic Places on February 14, 1985.

Description and history
The Purington House stands in the northwestern interior reaches of Falmouth, on the west side of Mast Road, a short way south of Pride Farm Road.  The main house is a -story timber-frame structure, with a gabled roof, central chimney, clapboard siding, and stone foundation.  It has a number of additions, including a 20th-century garage and an ell joining it to a 19th-century barn.  Its front facade is symmetrically arranged, with a center entrance topped by three-light transom window, and framed by a modest surround with entablature.  Windows are either six-over-six or nine-over-six sash, and are framed by narrow molding, similar to that found at the building corners and in the interior. Also located on the property is an L-shaped 19th century barn.

The house was built in 1761 by Elisha Purington, a Quaker who had a reputation throughout New England as a clockmaker.  He is also known to have served the local community as a blacksmith and gunmaker.  The roof his recently built house was torn off during a hurricane in 1767.  The assemblage of surviving 18th and 19th-century buildings is among the finest in a rural inland setting in the state.

See also
National Register of Historic Places listings in Cumberland County, Maine
Purington

References

Houses completed in 1761
Houses on the National Register of Historic Places in Maine
Farms on the National Register of Historic Places in Maine
Buildings and structures in Falmouth, Maine
Purington
National Register of Historic Places in Cumberland County, Maine
Farms in Cumberland County, Maine